Cranberry is a township in Venango County, Pennsylvania, United States. The population was 6,310 at the 2020 census, a decrease from 6,685 in 2010, which represented a decrease from the figure of 7,014 at the 2000 census.

Geography

Demographics

As of the census of 2000, there were 7,014 people, 2,843 households, and 2,066 families residing in the township.  The population density was 99.7 people per square mile (38.5/km2).  There were 3,054 housing units at an average density of 43.4/sq mi (16.8/km2).  The racial makeup of the township was 98.67% White, 0.31% African American, 0.24% Native American, 0.20% Asian, 0.24% from other races, and 0.33% from two or more races. Hispanic or Latino of any race were 0.66% of the population.

There were 2,843 households, out of which 31.1% had children under the age of 18 living with them, 59.2% were married couples living together, 9.7% had a female householder with no husband present, and 27.3% were non-families. 24.0% of all households were made up of individuals, and 11.4% had someone living alone who was 65 years of age or older.  The average household size was 2.46 and the average family size was 2.89.

In the township the population was spread out, with 24.1% under the age of 18, 7.5% from 18 to 24, 26.2% from 25 to 44, 25.9% from 45 to 64, and 16.2% who were 65 years of age or older.  The median age was 40 years. For every 100 females, there were 94.2 males.  For every 100 females age 18 and over, there were 91.2 males.

The median income for a household in the township was $34,547, and the median income for a family was $40,063. Males had a median income of $31,573 versus $24,750 for females. The per capita income for the township was $16,361.  About 10.6% of families and 11.8% of the population were below the poverty line, including 16.2% of those under age 18 and 6.1% of those age 65 or over.

Unincorporated community
 Bredinsburg – Also known in 1906 as Breydensburg.

References

External links

Cranberry Township Official Website

 

Populated places established in 1825
Townships in Venango County, Pennsylvania
Townships in Pennsylvania